Arhopala paralea, the glazed oakblue, (sometimes in Amblypodia) is a small butterfly found in India that belongs to the lycaenids or blues family.

Range
The butterfly occurs in India from Manipur to Shan states.

Status
It was considered rare by William Harry Evans in 1932.

See also
List of butterflies of India (Lycaenidae)

Cited references

References
  
 
 
 

Arhopala
Butterflies of Asia
Taxa named by William Harry Evans